While You Were Out is Soul Asylum's third studio album, which was released on November 21, 1986.

"The Judge" was later covered by The Wildhearts on their album Stop Us If You've Heard This One Before, Vol 1.. "Closer to the Stars" was covered by Automatic 7 on their debut release BYO Records.

Track listing
"Freaks" – 3:26
"Carry On" – 2:22
"No Man's Land" – 2:56
"Crashing Down" – 2:16
"The Judge" – 3:09
"Sun Don't Shine" – 2:45
"Closer to the Stars" – 2:51
"Never Too Soon" – 2:59
"Miracle Mile" – 2:17
"Lap of Luxury" – 1:53
"Passing Sad Daydream" – 6:13

References 

1986 albums
Soul Asylum albums
Twin/Tone Records albums